Pola Negri: Life is a Dream in Cinema is a feature-length biographical documentary film by Polish-American director Mariusz Kotowski released in 2006.  The film chronicles the life of Polish silent film actress Pola Negri, as told by those who knew her and those who have studied her life and films.

The documentary is the first directorial work of Polish-born director Mariusz Kotowski.  Kotowski had previously worked as a dancer and dance choreographer, and invested three years of work and a considerable personal fortune into producing the Pola Negri: Life is a Dream in Cinema documentary.  He has gone on to direct the Holocaust film Esther's Diary (2010, originally released as Forgiveness [2008]), which featured a lead character built strongly on Pola Negri, and the erotic psychological thriller Deeper and Deeper (2009) starring David Lago (The Young and the Restless). Kotowski also went on to author a Polish-language Pola Negri biography entitled Pola Negri: Legenda Hollywood (English title: Pola Negri: Hollywood Legend), which was released in Poland in 2011.

Interviews and narration

The most notable interviews in Pola Negri: Life is a Dream in Cinema are with film stars Hayley Mills and Eli Wallach.  Mills was starring actress and Wallach supporting actor in the Walt Disney film The Moon-Spinners (1964), Pola Negri's final film.  In the documentary, both actors retell their stories of working with Negri in that film.

Others interviewed for the film included Jeanine Basinger, professor and author; A.C. Lyles, producer for Paramount Pictures;  Alfred Allan Lewis, ghostwriter of Pola Negri's autobiography Memoirs of a Star (1970);  Emily Leider, author of Rudolph Valentino biography Dark Lover;  Anthony Slide, film historian;  David Gasten, webmaster of The Pola Negri Appreciation Site; and Scott Eyman, author of  Ernst Lubitsch: Laughter in Paradise.

The documentary is narrated by actress Cyndi Williams, who played a small voiceover role in Kotowski's Esther's Diary and a supporting live action role in Deeper and Deeper, making her the only actor to appear as a cast member in all of Kotowski's films to date.

Preview films and trailers

The film's production company Bright Shining City Productions has released several different trailers and preview short subjects for Pola Negri: Life is a Dream in Cinema.  The first, released in 2005, was an untitled 14-minute preview trailer that was released while the feature film itself was still being edited; this short film was re-edited slightly and reissued as the 16-minute, two-part short subject Pola Negri: Hollywood Legend. Both versions of this short subject are notable for featuring interview footage with Polish-born model Agnieszka Zakreta, best known as the 2003 Miss Illinois USA.  None of Miss Zakreta's interview footage was used in the feature film. The most recent trailer, released in June 2010 and running four and one-half minutes long, is a compilation of excerpts from Pola Negri's musical numbers in A Woman Commands (1932) and Mazurka (1935) interspersed with highlights from many of her films.

Screenings and awards

Pola Negri: Life is a Dream in Cinema made its world premiere on April 29, 2006 at Laemmle's Sunset 5 Theatre in Hollywood as part of the Seventh Annual Polish Film Festival of Los Angeles.  The film went on to appear at the Museum of Modern Art (MoMA) in New York and La Cinémathèque Française in Paris, appeared in numerous film festivals and Pola Negri film retrospectives in the United States and Europe, and was featured in a lengthy 35 minute news report about the making of the film on Poland's TVP1 channel.

The documentary was also the recipient of the following awards:
WorldFest-Houston International Film Festival - Remi Award, Special Jury Selection - April 2006
Dixie Film Festival, Atlanta - Best Documentary - October 2006
EMPixx Award - Gold - 2009
IndieFest - Award of Excellence - 2010 
Southern California Motion Picture Council - Golden Halo Award - 2010

DVD release

Director Mariusz Kotowski's production company Bright Shining City Productions released Pola Negri: Life is a Dream in Cinema on DVD in 2010 as part of a DVD/poster set.  The set is currently being sold direct via Bright Shining City Productions' official website.

Cast

Main

Hayley Mills (star of Negri's final film The Moon-Spinners)
Eli Wallach, (supporting actor in The Moon-Spinners)
A.C. Lyles (producer for Paramount Pictures)
Cyndi Williams as the Narrator

Other interviewees
Jeanine Basinger (film historian, professor and author of numerous film books)
Scott Eyman (author of the book Ernst Lubitsch: Laughter in Paradise)
David Gasten (webmaster, The Pola Negri Appreciation Site)
Brother Alexis Gonzales, FSC (late professor at Loyola University New Orleans, who knew Pola Negri personally)
Emily Leider (author of Rudolph Valentino biography Dark Lover: The Life and Death of Rudolph Valentino)
Allan Alfred Lewis (ghostwriter of Pola Negri autobiography Memoirs of a Star)
George Schoenbrunn (close friend of Pola Negri's)
Anthony Slide (film historian and author of numerous film books)
Tony Villecco (author of unpublished biography about Pola Negri)

Dancers in tango sequence
Dario DaSilva
Roula Giannopoulou
Lorraine Muller
Carolina Orlonsky
Felipe Telpora Jr.
Ivan Terrazas

Crew
Mariusz Kotowski, Director
Heidi Hutter, Executive Producer
Lynn Moran, Screenwriter 
Mariusz Gorz, Music Score
Simone Zimmerman, Director of Photography
Elke Stappert, Director of Photography
John Schaaf, Assistant Cinematographer
Brian Burrowes, Animation
John Larsen, Editor
Richard Shirt, Music Consultant
Bonena Konkiel, Music Consultant

Music used for soundtrack taken from Frédéric Chopin's 24 Preludes, Op. 28: 
No. 4 in E minor ("Suffocation"), No. 7 in A Major ("The Polish Dancer"), No. 15 in D Flat Major ("Raindrop"), and No. 21 in B Flat Major ("Sunday")

Voiceover recording by Black Productions; Phillip Hubner, Engineer
Audio Post Production by David Bewley and Corey Roberts, 501 Audio, Austin
Color Correction by Omar Godinez and Mike Curtis, Color Cafe, Austin

Tango scenes choreographed by Mariusz Kotowski and filmed in New York

Film and Photo Sources: Photofest, St. Mary's University (Texas), Library of Moving Images, New York Public Library at Lincoln Center, New-York Historical Society

Location footage shot in Los Angeles, New York, and San Antonio

See also
Pola Negri
Hayley Mills
Eli Wallach
A.C. Lyles

References

External links 
 
Bright Shining City Productions' Pola Negri: Life is a Dream in Cinema page
POLANEGRI.COM's Pola Negri: Life is a Dream in Cinema page
Polish Cultural Institute's Pola Negri: Life is a Dream on Cinema page
Pola Negri: Life is a Dream in Cinema 2010 trailer
Pola Negri: Hollywood Legend, Part 1 and Part 2 (16-minute preview short subject)

Documentary films about actors
2006 documentary films
2006 films
2000s English-language films